Air France Flight 296Q was a chartered flight of a new Airbus A320-111 operated by Air France for Air Charter International. On 26 June 1988, the plane crashed while making a low pass over Mulhouse–Habsheim Airfield (ICAO airport code LFGB) as part of the Habsheim Air Show. Most of the crash sequence, which occurred in front of several thousand spectators, was caught on video. 

This particular flight was the A320's first passenger flight (most of those on board were journalists and raffle winners). All the passengers survived the initial impact, but a woman and two children died from smoke inhalation before they could escape after struggling to unfasten the seatbelt.

Official reports concluded that the pilots flew too low, too slow, failed to see the forest and accidentally flew into it. The captain, Michel Asseline, disputed the report and claimed an error in the fly-by-wire computer prevented him from applying thrust and pulling up. Five individuals, including the captain and first officer, were later found guilty of involuntary manslaughter. Captain Asseline, who maintained his innocence, would go on to serve ten months of prison and a further ten months of probation.

This was the first fatal crash of an Airbus A320.

Aircraft
The accident aircraft, an Airbus A320-111, registration F-GFKC, serial number 9, first flew on 6 January 1988 and was delivered to Air France on 23 June, three days prior to its destruction. It was the third A320 delivered to Air France, the launch customer.

Flight deck crew 
Captain Michel Asseline, 44, had been a pilot with Air France for almost twenty years and had the following endorsements: Caravelle; Boeing 707, 727, and 737; and Airbus A300 and A310. He was a highly distinguished pilot with 10,463 flight hours. A training captain since 1979, Asseline was appointed to head the company's A320 training subdivision at the end of 1987. As Air France's technical pilot, he had been heavily involved in test flying the A320 type and had carried out maneuvers beyond normal operational limitations. Asseline had total confidence in the aircraft's computer systems.

First Officer Pierre Mazières, 45, had been flying with the airline since 1969 and had been a training captain for six years. He was endorsed on the Caravelle, Boeing 707 and 737, and had qualified as an A320 captain three months before the accident. Mazières had 10,853 hours of flight time.

Flight plan 
At the time of the incident, only three of the new aircraft type had been delivered to Air France, and the newest one (in service for two days) had been chosen for the flyover.

The aircraft was to fly from Charles de Gaulle Airport to Basel–Mulhouse Airport for a press conference. Then, sightseeing charter passengers would board and the aircraft would fly the short distance to the small Mulhouse–Habsheim Airfield. The captain would make a low-level fly-pass over Runway 02, climb up and turn back, and repeat the fly-pass over the same runway in the reciprocal direction (Runway 20). This would be followed by a sightseeing trip south to Mont Blanc before the passengers would be returned to Basel–Mulhouse Airport. Finally, the aircraft would return to Paris.

The pilots had each had a busy weekend and did not receive the flight plan until the morning of the flight. They received no verbal details about the flyover or the aerodrome itself.

Flyover 

The captain would slow the aircraft to its minimum flying speed with maximum angle of attack, disable the "alpha floor" (the function that would otherwise automatically increase engine thrust when the angle of attack reached 15°) and rely on the first officer to adjust the engine thrust manually to maintain 100 feet. After the first pass, the first officer would then apply the takeoff/go-around switch (TOGA) power and climb steeply before turning back for the second pass. "I've done it twenty times!" Asseline assured his first officer. The flyover had been approved by Air France's Air Operations Directorate and Flight Safety Department, and air traffic control and Basel tower had been informed.

Habsheim aerodrome was too small to be listed in the aircraft's flight computer, thereby requiring a visual approach; both pilots were also unfamiliar with the airfield when they began their descent from  only  from the field. This distance was too short for them to stabilise the aircraft's altitude and speed for the flyover. Additionally, the captain was expecting from the flight plan to do the pass over runway 02 ( long, paved) and was preparing for that alignment. But as the aircraft approached the field, the flight deck crew noticed that the spectators were gathered beside runway 34R ( long, grass).

From higher up, the forest at the end of 34R had looked like a different type of grass. But now that the aircraft was performing its flyover at only thirty feet, the crew noticed the aircraft was lower than the now-identified hazard that they were fast approaching. The cockpit voice recorder recorded the first officer's call:

First officer: "TOGA power! Go-around track!"

Followed by:

Cockpit area microphone (CAM): [Increase in engine speed]
CAM: [Noises of impact in the trees]
Captain: "Oh shit!"
END OF TAPE

The crew applied full power and Asseline attempted to climb. However, the elevators did not respond to the pilot's commands because the A320's computer system engaged its "alpha protection" mode (meant to prevent the aircraft from entering a stall). Less than five seconds later, the turbines began ingesting leaves and branches as the aircraft skimmed the tops of the trees. The combustion chambers clogged and the engines failed. The aircraft fell to the ground.

Traditionally, pilots respect the inherent dangers of flying at low speeds at low altitude, and normally, a pilot would not attempt to fly an aircraft so close to stalling with the engines at flight idle (minimum thrust setting in flight). In this instance, however, the pilots involved did not hesitate to fly the aircraft below its normal minimum flying speed because the purpose of the flyover was to demonstrate that the aircraft's computer systems would ensure that lift would always be available regardless of how the pilots handled the controls. Asseline's experience of flying the aircraft type at the outer limits of its flight performance envelope may have led to overconfidence and complacency.

Crash and evacuation 
During the impact, the right wing was torn off, and the spilling fuel ignited immediately. Two fire trucks at the airshow set off and an ambulance followed. Local emergency services were informed by radio communication.

Inside the aircraft, many of the passengers were dazed from hitting their heads on the backs of the seats in front of them. Some passengers had difficulty unfastening their seatbelts because they were unfamiliar with the mechanism (which differs from the type used in car seatbelts). The purser went to announce instructions to the passengers but the public address system handset had been torn off. He then tried to open the left-side forward door, which was blocked by trees. The door opened partway, and the emergency escape slide began inflating while it was stuck partly inside the fuselage. The purser, a passenger, and a flight attendant (a guest from another airline) managed to push the door fully open. In the process, the purser and the passenger were thrown out of the fuselage with the slide landing on top of them. The flight attendant then began evacuating the passengers but they soon began to pile up at the bottom of the slide as their route was blocked by trees and branches. The egress of the passengers was temporarily halted while the purser and another flight attendant began clearing the branches. When the evacuation continued, the flight attendant stayed at the door, helping passengers, until she began suffering from smoke inhalation.

By this time, the fire had entered the right side of the fuselage through the damaged floor section between seat rows 10 and 15. A passenger tried to open the left-side overwing exit. It would not open, which was fortunate as there was by that time a fire on the left wing.

The panicking passengers now began pushing toward the front of the cabin. A flight attendant standing in the centre of the cabin at seat 12D was pushed into the aisle by a severely burnt passenger from 12F. Then, as she was helping another passenger whose clothes were on fire, she was carried forward by the surge of people rushing to escape. After the rush of people had left and the interior was fast becoming toxic, she stood at the front door and called back into the cabin. There was no reply and the thick black smoke made a visual check impossible, so she exited the fuselage. The evacuation from the rear door had been fast and smooth thanks to the instructions from the flight attendants at the rear of the aircraft.

The medical team from the airshow arrived and began examining the passengers. Ten minutes after the crash, the first of the fire trucks arrived. But because of the forest, only the smaller vehicles were able to reach the wreckage. Apart from the tail section, the aircraft was consumed by fire.

Of 136 people on board, three did not escape. One was a disabled boy in seat 4F who was unable to move. Another was a girl in seat 8C, who was unable to remove her seatbelt (her older brother had removed his own seatbelt but was carried away by the rush of people before he could help his sister). The third was a woman who had reached the front door and then returned to help the girl. Thirty-four passengers required hospitalisation for injuries and burns. Both pilots received minor head injuries and also suffered from smoke inhalation and shock.

Accident investigation 
The official investigation was carried out by the Bureau of Enquiry and Analysis for Civil Aviation Safety (BEA), the French air accident investigation bureau, in conjunction with Air France and Airbus. Although the official investigation was written in French, the BEA released an English version on 29 November 1989. The translated version of the report can be found on the Aviation Accidents Database and at the Aviation Safety Network.

Flight recorders
The plane's flight recorders were found still attached in the unburnt tail section. The Cockpit Voice Recorder (CVR) continued to operate for about 1.5 seconds after the initial impact. The Digital Flight Data Recorder (DFDR) continued to operate for about one second, then recorded nonsensical data for another two seconds. Interruption of the power occurred forward of the tail section—most probably in the wheel-well area, which was heavily damaged.

The CVR was read during the night of 26 June at the BEA. The transcription was later clarified with the assistance of the pilots involved. The tape speed was set using the 400 Hz frequency of the aircraft's electrical supply and then synchronised with the air traffic control recordings, which included a time track.

The DFDR was read the same night by the Brétigny sur Orge Flight Test Centre:
 12:44:14 - the engine power is reduced to flight idle. Three seconds later, the undercarriage is extended. A further ten seconds later, 'Flaps 2' is selected.
 12:44:45 - 'Flaps 3' is selected as the aircraft descends through  at an airspeed of 177 knots.
 12:45:06 - the aircraft descends through  at an airspeed of 155 knots.
During this manoeuvre, a fluctuation in the radio altimeter height corresponds to the aircraft passing over a patch of trees (whereas before and after this fluctuation, the readings of the radio altimeter and those of the barometric altimeter match perfectly). Three seconds later, the aircraft descends through  at an airspeed of 132 knots. The Captain begins to flare the aircraft (he lifts the nose 4°) to level its flight.
 12:45:30 - nose-up attitude increases to 7°.
 12:45:35 - nose-up attitude is now 15° and speed is 122 knots. TOGA power is applied. Four seconds later, the aircraft begins striking the treetops.

Aircraft and engines
Investigators found that the aircraft had been airworthy, that its weight and centre-of-gravity had been within limits, and that there was no evidence of mechanical or electronic systems failure.

The flight deck crew believed that the engines had failed to respond to the application of full power. With the CFM56-5 engines, four seconds are required to go from 29% N1 (flight idle) to 67%. It then takes one second more to go from 67 to 83% N1. From the engine parameters recorded on the DFDR and spectral analysis of the engine sounds on the CVR, it was determined that five seconds after TOGA power was applied, the N1 speed of Nº1 engine was 83% while that of Nº2 engine was 84%. Spectral analysis of the engine sounds indicated that 0.6 seconds later, both engines had reached 91% (by this stage, they were starting to ingest vegetation). This response of the engines complied with their certification data.

Official report
The official report from BEA concluded that the probable cause of the accident was a combination of the following:

 Very low flyover height, lower than surrounding obstacles;
 Speed very slow and reducing to reach maximum possible angle of attack;
 Engines speed at flight idle; and
 Late application of go-around power.

Furthermore, the bureau concluded that if the descent below 100 feet was not deliberate, it may have resulted from a failure by the crew to take proper account of the visual and aural information available to them regarding the elevation "above ground level" (AGL) of the aircraft.

The report further recommended that:
 Passengers should be banned from all demonstration flights
 Flight crews should be provided with – and ensure – proper reconnaissance of airfields
 Airline company procedures should be reviewed to ensure they comply with official regulations concerning altitude

Prosecutions
In 1996, Captain Asseline, First Officer Mazières, two Air France officials and the president of the flying club sponsoring the air show were all charged with involuntary manslaughter. In 1997, all five were found guilty. Asseline was initially sentenced to six months in prison along with twelve months of probation. Mazières was given a twelve month suspended sentence. The others were sentenced to probation. Asseline walked free from the court and said he would appeal to France's highest court, the Court of Cassation. According to French law, Asseline was required to submit himself to the prison system before his case could be taken up by the Court of Cassation. In 1998, Asseline's appeal was rejected and his sentence was increased to ten months of imprisonment along with ten months of probation.

Alternative explanation
The television documentary series Mayday also reports claims in Season 9 Episode 3 that the plane's flight recorder might have been tampered with and indicated that four seconds had been cut from the tape; this was shown by playing back a control tower tape and comparing it to the remaining tape. Asseline argues that he attempted to apply thrust earlier than indicated in the flight recorder data. When he increased throttle to level off at 100 ft, the engines did not respond. Asseline claims that this indicated a problem with the aeroplane's fly-by-wire system rather than pilot error. After a few seconds, Asseline claims, he became worried that the plane's completely computerised throttle control had malfunctioned and responded by pulling the throttle all the way back then forward again. By that time the aircraft had touched the trees. Mayday also looks at the theory that it was the computer at fault, not the pilots. Because the aircraft's altitude had fallen below 100 ft, the plane's computer may have been programmed to believe it was landing and therefore prevent any drastic manoeuvres from either pilot. When the crew suddenly asked the plane for more power and lift, it may have simply ignored them.

It was also claimed by the Institute of Police Forensic Evidence and Criminology, based in Switzerland, that the flight data recorders may have been switched and were not the original ones in the airplane. Airbus made a detailed rebuttal of these claims in a document published in 1991, contending that the independent investigator employed by the filmmakers made an error when synchronising the recordings based on a misunderstanding of how the "Radio Transmit" parameter on the flight data recorder functioned.

Dramatization 
The episode "Blaming the Pilot" of the TV series Survival in the Sky featured the accident.

The Discovery Channel Canada / National Geographic TV series Mayday featured the accident and subsequent investigation in a season 9 episode titled "Pilot vs. Plane" and included an interview with Captain Michel Asseline, survivors, and accident investigators.

The episode "Disastrous Descents" of the TV series Aircrash Confidential produced by WMR Productions and IMG Entertainment, featured the accident and included an interview with Captain Michel Asseline.

See also 
 List of accidents and incidents involving commercial aircraft
 List of airshow accidents and incidents

Notes

Footnotes

External links 
 Commission of Inquiry into the accident on 26 June 1988 in Mulhouse–Habsheim (Archive) 

1988 in France
296
Accidents and incidents involving the Airbus A320
Aviation accidents and incidents in 1988
Aviation accidents and incidents in France
Airliner accidents and incidents caused by pilot error
Aviation accidents and incidents at air shows
Aviation accident investigations with disputed causes
Airliner accidents and incidents involving controlled flight into terrain
Conspiracy theories in France
Conspiracy theories involving aviation incidents
June 1988 events in Europe